Samoylovsky (masculine), Samoylovskaya (feminine), or Samoylovskoye (neuter) is the name of several rural localities in Russia.

Modern localities
Samoylovsky, Astrakhan Oblast, a settlement in Kozlovsky Selsoviet of Volodarsky District in Astrakhan Oblast; 
Samoylovsky, Orenburg Oblast, a khutor in Novonikolsky Selsoviet of Sharlyksky District in Orenburg Oblast
Samoylovsky, Volgograd Oblast, a khutor in Kumylzhensky Selsoviet of Kumylzhensky District in Volgograd Oblast
Samoylovskaya, a village in Vozhegodsky Selsoviet of Vozhegodsky District in Vologda Oblast

Alternative names
Samoylovskaya, alternative name of Samylovskaya, a village in Kozminsky Selsoviet of Lensky District in Arkhangelsk Oblast;